Kedmi is a Jewish surname. Notable people with the surname include:

 Shani Kedmi (born 1977), Israeli Olympic sailor
 Yaacov Kedmi, Israeli Supreme Court Judge, head of Kedmi Commission in 1995
 Yaakov Kedmi (born 1947), Russian-Israeli politician and diplomat

Jewish surnames